Platycheirus thylax is a species of syrphid fly in the family Syrphidae.

References

Syrphinae
Articles created by Qbugbot
Insects described in 1944
Taxa named by Frank Montgomery Hull